Fred "Fritz" Wetherbee (born July 3, 1936) is a New Hampshire writer and television host. Fritz has been honored with five Emmy Awards.

He was born July 3, 1936, and named for his grandfather Fred Minot Wetherbee II. For 10 years (1975–84) he was news director and general manager of radio stations WSCV/WSLE-FM in Peterborough. From 1985 to 1995 he was the host of New Hampshire Crossroads on Public Television. He currently has his own segment on New Hampshire Chronicle.

Family 

He was born on July 3, 1936, Memorial Hospital, Nashua, New Hampshire. He was the first child of Frederick Minot and Mary Catherine (née Butler) Wetherbee of Milford, New Hampshire. He was one of five siblings (four boys, one girl). He is a ninth generation Yankee (John Wetherbee arrived in Boston in 1765).

He resides in Acworth, New Hampshire.

He has one son, Caleb Addison, born in 1962.  He has two granddaughters, Sophia and Anna,

His marital status is in a “committed” relationship with NH Chronicle.

Career 

He served in the US Army Special Services from 1958-1960, where he placed third in the All-Army Entertainment Contest 1959-1960 of 44,000 acts and appeared with other soldiers on the Ed Sullivan Show from 1959-1960.

He worked as a reporter and photographer for the Monadnock Ledger from 1962-1968.

He began his media career as the Nathaniel Hawthorne College Theater Production Instructor in 1963, later teaching Media at Keene State College Media Instructor in 1980 and 1984.

He worked as a filmmaker/cinematographer at New HampshirePTV from 1969-1975. At WSLE-WSCV radio he was general manager and news director from 1976-1984, also serving as a contributing reporter on All Things Considered. He was a reporter on the Ten O'clock News, WGBH-TV, from 1986-1994 and a Chronicle Contributing Talent for WCVB-TV, in 1990. He was the New Hampshire-Crossroads New HampshirePTV Host/producer/writer/editor from 1986-2000 and a storyteller/historian on WMUR TV, 2000–Present.

He was Pitteway and Partners Advertising Creative Director from 1984-1986.

In 2023, Wetherbee voiced the character "Fritzy" in the animated short film The Ten Commandments of Banquet Serving, which was written and directed by fellow New Hampshire writer Griffin "The" Hansen.

Audio 

 Speak N'Hampsha Like a Native An comic audio recording. Hundreds of copies sold since 1986

Voice-over (and/or hosting) 

 Ken Burns' Baseball, The Making of Baseball Episode 1 
 The Works of Robert Frost (won New England Emmy in 1995)
 Voice of Sony national radio campaign 1984
 White Mountain Enterprises (Region Association)
 Franconia Notch Visitor’s Center
 Mount Washington]] Observatory Center
 Monadnock Region Association
 Winnipesaukee Lake Association
 New Hampshire Film Board
 Hoosac Tunnel Visitor Center, North Adams, MA
 NH Public Works Mutual Aid information Video
 The Ten Commandments of Banquet Serving (2023 - animated short film)

Producer and Writer 

 Just Up The Road Nine specials, New HampshirePTV*
 New Hampshire Remembered, parts I, II, III, New HampshirePTV
 Secrets of the Mt Washington Hotel New HampshirePTB
 Covered Bridges of New England PBS (shown nationally)
 Josie Langmaid, The Murdered Maiden Student New HampshirePTV
 University of New Hampshire Centennial History New HampshireP
 A Light on the Mountain Funded by Olin Foundation
 Grace Metalious and Peyton Place New HampshirePTV  (shown nationally)
 Styron, Plimpton, Updike at MacDowell WGBH
 Francis Ouimet Story WGBH
 Grover Cleveland New HampshirePTV
 MacDowell, an American Artists' Colony New HampshirePTV  (shown nationally)
 Soul of a Woman, the story of Mary Baker Eddy New HampshirePTV
 Furniture Makers of New Hampshire companion to Currier Art Museum Show
 Wrote, produced and edited most of his New HampshirePTV segments and specials

Honors 

 New England Emmy Producer, Public Affairs 1995
 New England Emmy Hosting 1996
 New England Emmy On-camera talent 2004
 New England Emmy Producer, Outstanding historical program 2006
 New England Emmy Commentary/editorial 2008
 Nominations Ten New England Emmy nominations
 Golden Mike Five awards New Hampshire Association of Broadcasters
 Bobble-head Doll “Fritz Wetherbee Day” New Hampshire Fisher Cats Baseball 2006
 Valley Forge Freedom Medal 1970
 National Endowment for the Arts grant 1971
 Citizen of the Year, Monadnock Jaycees 1985
 New Hampshire Historic Preservation Award 1993
 The Museum of Modern Art presented his film* “James B. Conant* New Hampshire, Harvard, and the A-Bomb” 1996.
 Media Award, Molly Stark Chapter DAR 2004
 History Recognition Award, Souhegan Valley C of Commerce 2007
 Community Builder Award, Masonic Lodge #7,Milford, New Hampshire 2007
 Granite State Award, Plymouth State University 2009
 Doctor of Humane Letters “honoris causa” Rivier College 2009
 Doctor of Humane Letters “honoris causa” New England College 2013

References 

American television hosts
People from Nashua, New Hampshire
Living people
1936 births
Writers from New Hampshire
People from Milford, New Hampshire